Phlebia subochracea is a fungal plant pathogen.

Fungal plant pathogens and diseases
Meruliaceae
Fungi described in 1805
Taxa named by Johannes Baptista von Albertini
Taxa named by Lewis David de Schweinitz